Frederick Tuckett (1807–1876) was a New Zealand surveyor, explorer and New Zealand Company agent. He was born in Frenchay, Gloucestershire, England in about 1807. He surveyed Nelson and Dunedin.

References

1807 births
1876 deaths
New Zealand explorers
English emigrants to New Zealand
Explorers of New Zealand